Boost Mobile is an American wireless service provider owned by Dish Wireless. It uses the merged T-Mobile network (Sprint + T-Mobile) and AT&T to deliver wireless services. As of Q4 2022, Boost Mobile, along with its sister brands Ting Mobile, Republic Wireless, and Gen Mobile, had 7.98 million customers.

It was founded as a joint venture between Peter Adderton, Craig Cooper, Kirt McMaster, and Nextel Communications. It was purchased by Nextel in 2003 and, as a result of the merger between Sprint Corporation and Nextel, then became owned by Sprint in 2004. It would then be purchased by Dish Wireless on July 1, 2020 as a result of the merger between T-Mobile and Sprint.

History 

After Peter Adderton founded Boost Mobile Australia and New Zealand in 2000, Peter Adderton, Craig Cooper, and Kirt McMaster brought the Boost Mobile brand to the United States in 2001 as a joint venture with Nextel Communications. Using Nextel's iDEN network, Boost Mobile offered an unlimited push-to-talk service, marketed as only costing a dollar a day, at a time when cellphone plans offering unlimited talk were still rare. The service was initially exclusive to markets in areas of California and Nevada and was marketed towards urban minorities, often using urban slang in advertisements. Eventually, Nextel became the sole owner of Boost's United States operations in 2003. Nextel began to expand the brand elsewhere in the United States in late 2004 after its acquisition by Sprint Corporation which was announced on December 15, 2004.

After the approval of the merger in July, 2005, Sprint Corporation acquired Nextel Communications, leaving Boost Mobile as a subsidiary of the merged company, Sprint Nextel Corporation. Boost Mobile still continued to use the previous Nextel iDEN infrastructure for its service, but in 2006, began to offer a new Unlimited by Boost Mobile service in select markets using Sprint's CDMA network, offering unlimited talk, text, and internet. While the plans resulted in significant growth for Boost Mobile, Boost did not begin shifting to CDMA entirely.

To compete with unlimited offerings from competitors in the wireless industry, Boost Mobile announced on January 15, 2009, that it would launch a Monthly Unlimited Plan. The plan was accompanied by re-focusing the brand towards a broader demographic than before. The new unlimited plan resulted in a net gain of more than 674,000 customers in about three months. Despite this lift, Nextel overall suffered a gross subscriber loss of 1.25 million contract subscriptions. The unexpected surge in popularity for the service caused significant strain on the Nextel iDEN networkas many customers reported long and sometimes week-long delays in receiving text messages. A Boost Mobile spokesman said that they did not anticipate the level of popularity for the new service and that efforts to improve the network had been implemented to help mitigate the problem.

At the 2010 Consumer Electronics Show, Boost Mobile announced it would begin to offer a new unlimited plan using Sprint's CDMA network. Sprint would also acquire fellow prepaid wireless provider Virgin Mobile USA in 2010both Boost and Virgin Mobile would be re-organized into a new group within Sprint, encompassing the two brands and other no-contract phone services offered by the company.

Boost Mobile's parent company decommissioned the iDEN network on June 30, 2013; most iDEN customers have been migrated to the Sprint CDMA network.

In January 2020, Sprint discontinued the Virgin Mobile USA brand and transferred its customers to Boost Mobile.

On April 1, 2020, Sprint merged with T-Mobile, which also announced plans to sell Boost Mobile to Dish Network. The sale was completed on July 1. All new Boost Mobile customers will use the T-Mobile network, with the remaining Sprint customers to be moved to the T-Mobile network over time.

In May 2020, during the George Floyd protests in Minneapolis–Saint Paul, 19 Boost Mobile stores were damaged during widespread rioting and looting, with four locations being severely damaged by arson.

On July 19, 2021, Dish Wireless announced it was purchasing $5 billion of wholesale wireless over the next 10 years from AT&T. In exchange, Dish will share some of its 5G spectrum with AT&T.

Released phones 
In June 2010, Boost Mobile launched the Motorola i1 smartphone, Boost's first iDEN-based push-to-talk Android phone, and in April 2011, they announced the Samsung Galaxy Prevail, the company's first CDMA-based Android offering.

In July 2012, Boost Mobile released the BlackBerry Curve 9310, and in March 2013, they released the HTC One SV and the ZTE-made Boost Force smartphone, the company's first device using Sprint's 4G LTE network. In June that year, Boost Mobile released the LG Optimus F7, the company's first device with a removable Universal Integrated Circuit Card (UICC) for LTE network authentication/access, a new form of Subscriber identity module (SIM card).

In December 2014, Boost Mobile released the Lumia 635, its first smartphone using Microsoft's Windows Phone mobile operating system, and in July 2015, they launched the NETGEAR Fuse along with no-contract Wi-Fi Hotspot plans, its first Mobile Wi-Fi Hotspot device.

Marketing 

The Boost Mobile brand was initially marketed to the teen and young adult demographics, heavily focused on action sports, lifestyle and urban music. Boost Mobile's past American advertising campaigns featured Los Rakas, Terry Kennedy, Kanye West, Ludacris, and The Game, and used the slang slogan "Where you at?" In late 2007, a Boost Mobile commercial with Young Jeezy, Jermaine Dupri, and Mickey Avalon was released. The "Where you at?" slogan referenced the walkie-talkie feature on all Boost Mobile phones and later evolved to highlight a social GPS application that was available on selected Boost Mobile phones. Boost have also used Indy Car driver Danica Patrick in a commercial. A 2005 episode of Adult Swim's Aqua Teen Hunger Force titled "Boost Mobile" was an early example of native advertising within a regular television series.

Boost Mobile has also produced some regional campaigns, including providing live paper shredders at bus stops in Chicago and Boston, where several times an hour sample contracts from competing wireless service providers would be shredded into confetti.

On January 20, 2010, Boost Mobile's then-parent company Sprint Nextel managed to secure some of the 1985 Chicago Bears players (including Jim McMahon, Willie Gault, and Mike Singletary) to re-create the team's famous "Super Bowl Shuffle" rap song and music video as "The Boost Mobile Shuffle" during the first quarter of the Super Bowl XLIV.

Boost Mobile debuted a television campaign in June 2012 to promote the HTC EVO Design 4G, its first smartphone using Sprint's 4G WiMAX network. The ads feature comedian Faizon Love as the "4Genie", a genie who magically appears where cellphone users seek low-cost 4G.

On July 1, 2021, the first day on which NCAA student-athletes were allowed to receive compensation for use of their name, image, and likeness (NIL), Boost announced that it had signed Haley and Hanna Cavinder, twin basketball players at Fresno State with a social media following in the millions, as spokespersons.

References

External links 
 

Dish Network
Sprint Corporation
Mobile phone companies of the United States
American companies established in 2001
Telecommunications companies established in 2001
Retail companies established in 2001
Mobile virtual network operators
Companies based in Irvine, California
Technology companies based in Greater Los Angeles
2001 establishments in California